Shape Shifter is the twenty-second studio album (thirty-sixth album overall) by Santana. It was released on May 14, 2012. This album is the first from his new record label Starfaith Records, which is distributed by Sony Music Entertainment, owners of all of Santana's albums (except those recorded for Polydor Records which are owned by Universal Music Group). It is also the first album since 1992's Milagro that does not feature guest singers in any of the songs, a style that characterized Santana's albums since Supernatural. The album contains only one song with vocals ("Eres La Luz"). The track "Mr. Szabo" is a homage to the Hungarian guitarist Gábor Szabó, one of Carlos Santana's early idols, who released a series of 8 albums for Impulse Records between 1966 and 1967; the track features a similar rhythmical and harmonic structure to "Gypsy Queen", a Szabó recording from 1966 covered by Santana in 1970 as a medley with Fleetwood Mac's "Black Magic Woman".

Track listing

Personnel
 Andy Vargas and Tony Lindsay – vocals (track 11)
 Carlos Santana – guitar
 Chester Thompson – keyboards
 Salvador Santana – keyboards
 Benny Rietveld – bass
 Dennis Chambers – drums
 Karl Perazzo – timbales, percussion
 Raul Rekow – congas, bongos, percussion
 Carlos Hernandez & Jorge Santana - Additional Guitars on track 3 "Nomad"

Charts

Year-end charts

References

 All information from CD release booklet (Copyright © 2012 Starfaith Records, catalog #76692-99966-2).

External links
 

2012 albums
Santana (band) albums
Albums produced by Walter Afanasieff
Albums produced by Eric Bazilian